Pete Cooke (born 1956) is a British computer games programmer, best known for his work published in the 1980s for the ZX Spectrum.

Career
His software often used a point and click GUI. As most Spectrum users did not own a mouse the pointer was manipulated by keyboard or joystick.

Cooke's games were often innovative. For example, Tau Ceti (released 1985) featured a form of solid 3D graphics but was also set on a planet with day and night cycles with dynamically drawn shadows. Micronaut One (released 1987) was set inside futuristic biocomputers with the player controlling a microscopic craft attempting to clear the tunnels of an insect-like life form called Scrim. This game also used fast-moving 3D graphics as well as featuring an enemy that went through a realistic (if speeded-up) life-cycle, beginning each level as eggs and progressing to larvae and eventually adult Scrim which would then lay more eggs. Even Cooke's more straightforward games, like the 1988 shoot 'em up Earthlight, featured their own complexities and technical gimmicks.

As well as these games, Cooke programmed the ZX Spectrum and Amstrad CPC versions of Stunt Car Racer and also released a game for the 16-bit Amiga and Atari ST in 1990 called Tower of Babel.

He worked at Leicester College as an IT lecturer and he teaches students how to create computer games using Microsoft XNA.

Recently he has created and released games for Apple Devices (iOS), including Zenfit and Everything Must Go.

Games
Invincible Island (1983)
The Inferno (1984)
Urban Upstart (1984)
UDG Generator (1984)
Maze Chase (1984)
Upper Gumtree (1985)
Ski Star 2000 (1985)
 (1985)
Tau Ceti (1985)
Room 10 (1986)
Academy (1987)
Micronaut One (1987)
Brainstorm (1987)
Earthlight (1988)
Zolyx (1988)
A Whole New Ball Game (1989)
Stunt Car Racer – ZX Spectrum conversion of Geoff Crammond's game (1989)
Granny's Garden (1989)
Tower Of Babel (1990)
Grand Prix (1992)
Grand Prix 2 (1996)
Grand Prix 3 (2000)
Zenfit (iOS) (2012)
Everything Must Go (iOS) (2013)

References

External links
Feature on Pete Cooke from a 1987 issue of Crash magazine.
Pete Cooke by Retro Gamer Team, 15 July 2014.
Zenfit on Apple App Store Zenfit on Apple App Store.
Everything Must Go on Apple App Store Everything Must Go on Apple App Store.

1956 births
British video game designers
British computer programmers
British video game programmers
Living people